The 1995 Philippine Basketball Association (PBA) rookie draft was an event at which teams drafted players from the amateur ranks. The annual rookie draft was held on January 8 at the New World Hotel in Makati.

Round 1

Round 2

Round 3

Round 4

Round 5

References

Philippine Basketball Association draft
draft